The first inauguration of George W. Bush as the 43rd president of the United States took place on Saturday, January 20, 2001, at the West Front of the United States Capitol in Washington, D.C. This was the 54th inauguration and marked the commencement of the first term of George W. Bush as president and Dick Cheney as vice president. Chief Justice William Rehnquist administered the presidential oath of office at 12:01 p.m., after he administered the vice presidential oath of office as well. An estimated 300,000 people attended the swearing-in ceremony. This was the first presidential inauguration to take place in the 21st century, and the first in the 3rd millennium.

Pre-inaugural events
On the eve of the inauguration, there was a celebration for U.S. authors hosted by Laura Bush at DAR Constitution Hall. Wayne Newton, Brooks & Dunn, and Ricky Martin performed as the pre-inaugural entertainment.

Thousands of demonstrators attended the inaugural ceremonies in Washington, D.C., to protest the outcome and controversial circumstances of the 2000 presidential election. Four protesters were arrested and Bush's limousine was hit by a tennis ball and an egg thrown from the crowd during the inaugural parade.

Gallery

See also
Presidency of George W. Bush
Presidential transition of George W. Bush
Second inauguration of George W. Bush
Timeline of the George W. Bush presidency (2001)
2000 United States presidential election
George W. Bush 2000 presidential campaign

References

External links

Sites for news coverage of the 2001 inauguration
Text of Bush's First Inaugural Address

2001 speeches
Inauguration 2001
2001 in American politics
United States presidential inaugurations
Inauguration 2001
Bush, G.W. 1
2001 in Washington, D.C.
January 2001 events in the United States
Articles containing video clips